This is a list of towns in New York. As of the 2020 United States population census, the 62 counties of the State of New York are subdivided into 933 towns and 61 cities.

Each town is contained within a single county, although there are ten pairs of towns with the same name located in separate counties:

 Albion (Orleans County) & Albion (Oswego County)
 Ashland (Chemung County) & Ashland (Greene County)
 Brighton (Franklin County) & Brighton (Monroe County)
 Chester (Orange County) & Chester (Warren County)
 Clinton (Clinton County) & Clinton (Dutchess County)
 Dickinson (Broome County) & Dickinson (Franklin County)
 Franklin (Delaware County) & Franklin (Franklin County)
 Fremont (Steuben County) & Fremont (Sullivan County)
 Greenville (Greene County) & Greenville (Orange County)
 Lewis (Essex County) & Lewis (Lewis County)

Towns and cities with same name 
There are 24 towns where a city of same name exists in the same county:
 Amsterdam town & city (Montgomery County)
 Batavia town & city (Genesee County)
 Binghamton town & city (Broome County)
 Canandaigua town & city (Ontario County)
 Corning town & city (Steuben County)
 Dunkirk town & city (Chautauqua County)
 Elmira town & city (Chemung County)
 Geneva town & city (Ontario County)
 Ithaca town & city (Tompkins County)
 Johnstown town & city (Fulton County)
 Kingston town & city (Ulster County)
 Little Falls town & city (Herkimer County)
 Lockport town & city (Niagara County)
 Newburgh town & city (Orange County)
 Norwich town & city (Chenango County)
 Olean town & city (Cattaraugus County)
 Oneonta town & city (Otsego County)
 Oswego town & city (Oswego County)
 Plattsburgh town & city (Clinton County)
 Poughkeepsie town & city (Dutchess County)
 Rye town & city (Westchester County)
 Salamanca town & city (Cattaraugus County)
 Tonawanda town & city (Erie County)
 Watertown town & city (Jefferson County)

In addition, three towns share names with cities in a different county:
 Fulton town (Schoharie County) & city (Oswego County)
 Middletown town (Delaware County) & city (Orange County)
 Rochester town (Ulster County) & city (Monroe County)

See also
 Administrative divisions of New York
 List of counties in New York
 List of cities in New York
 List of villages in New York
 List of census-designated places in New York

References

Towns
New York
New York